Anthony Weber (born 11 June 1987) is a French professional footballer who plays as a centre-back for Reims Sainte-Anne.

Career
Born and raised in Strasbourg, Weber started playing for his hometown's main football club, Strasbourg, at the age of 11. In 2006, he won the Coupe Gambardella with Strasbourg's U18 side, defeating Karim Benzema's Olympique Lyonnais in the final. He made his professional debut one year afterwards in a Ligue 2 game against Reims, entering as a substitute after Habib Bellaïd had been sent off. Weber did not see first team action the following season in Ligue 1 as he was barred by Bellaïd and Jean-Marc Furlan's new signings, Grégory Paisley and Pierre Ducrocq. For the 2008–09 season, Strasbourg was back in Ligue 2 and Weber started three league games in the first half of the season. During the winter transfer window, he was loaned to Paris FC, one division below, in order to gain some playing time.

Profile
Weber is a solid, tall centre-back with good placement skills. He has been compared to Léonard Specht.

References

External links
 
 Profile at Racingstub

1987 births
Living people
Footballers from Strasbourg
French people of German descent
Association football defenders
French footballers
Ligue 1 players
Ligue 2 players
RC Strasbourg Alsace players
Paris FC players
Stade de Reims players
Stade Brestois 29 players
Stade Malherbe Caen players